Ed Broth is the author of Stories From A Moron:  Real Stories Rejected by Real Magazines, published in January, 2005 by St. Martin's Press.  The book consists of numerous prank letters Broth mailed to magazines and their responses.  An example is his submission of an essay titled "I Love Dogs" to I Love Cats magazine.

The book shares many similarities with the books of Ted L. Nancy.  Both are prank authors who submit joke letters to real organizations and then publish their responses.  The covers of their books are also similar, showing the title and author's name written childishly.  As well, the books of both Broth and Nancy include a foreword by comedian Jerry Seinfeld, who claims in both books to have met with the authors.  In the foreword to Stories From A Moron, Seinfeld describes Broth as a "friend" and that his stories "don't completely make sense, but they don't make nonsense either". 

The dust jacket description of Broth is even more vague, stating that Broth "is a writer living in Toluca Lake, California.  He likes pimentos in his potato salad".

On the Ted L. Nancy official website, Barry Marder confesses to being both Ted L. Nancy and Ed Broth.
 
Jerry Seinfeld hosted a toast in Broth's honor, although Broth was not in attendance.

In 2005, Jerry Seinfeld, Barry Marder, and Kenneth Braun signed a deal for an animated comedy series pilot based on Stories From A Moron. 

Broth's most recent literary project is a book of cartoons called "The Oddvious". Many people believe that Alan Marder is the illustrator of "The Oddvious". Marder illustrated "Stories From A Moron: Real Stories Rejected by Real Magazines", as well as the "Letters From a Nut" books by Ted L. Nancy, and "Hello Junk Mail!" also by Ted L. Nancy.

Notes

See also
Ted L. Nancy
Barry Marder

Literary forgeries
21st-century pseudonymous writers